Chintya Fabyola (born February 20, 1995, in Pontianak, West Kalimantan, Indonesia) is an Indonesian beauty pageant titleholder who was crowned Puteri Indonesia Lingkungan 2015, at the 19th Puteri Indonesia 2015 pageant. She is representing Indonesia at the Miss International 2015 pageant.

Personal life
Fabyola live in Pontianak and she is currently student of business administration at Politeknik Negeri Pontianak, West Kalimantan, Indonesia. In 2011 Fabyola participated at Dare Pontianak pageant and placed as the 1st Runner-up. In 2013 she placed as the 1st Runner-up at the Putri Pariwisata West Kalimantan 2013. In 2015 she crowned Puteri Indonesia West Kalimantan 2015 and represented her province at the 19th annual Puteri Indonesia 2015 in Jakarta.

Puteri Kalimantan Barat 2014
Fabyola won the regional competition of Kalimantan Barat (West Kalimantan), and she deserve to represent her province in National Competition Puteri Indonesia 2015 where she placed as 1st Runner-up and would represent Indonesia in Miss International 2015 later.

Puteri Indonesia 2015
Fabyola represented West Kalimantan at the Puteri Indonesia 2015 on February 20, 2015, at Jakarta Convention Center, Jakarta. She crowned as Puteri Indonesia Lingkungan (Miss International Indonesia 2015). In addition, she awarded as the Best Traditional Costume (Theme: Pontianak Ethnic) and Puteri Indonesia Kalimantan 2015 (Favorite islands' princess). She is the second Puteri Indonesia contestant from West Kalimantan who was crowned as the 1st Runner-up after Sisca Amelia in 2003.

Miss International 2015
As Puteri Indonesia Lingkungan 2015, Fabyola will competed at the Miss International 2015 in Tokyo, Japan in November. Valerie Hernandez, Miss International 2014 of Puerto Rico will crown her successor at end of the event.

See also

 Puteri Indonesia 2015
 Miss International 2015
 Anindya Kusuma Putri
 Gresya Amanda Maaliwuga
 Syarifah Olvah Bwefar Alhamid

References

External links
 Puteri Indonesia Official Website
 Miss International Official Website
 

Living people
1995 births
Puteri Indonesia winners
Indonesian female models
Miss International 2015 delegates